The Third Man is a TV series which ran from 1959 to 1965. It was based on the novel and film The Third Man and starred Michael Rennie as Harry Lime. Lime is now an international private investigator.

The series was a co-production between the NTA Film Network and the BBC. The first twenty episodes were shot at 20th Century Fox studios in Hollywood. Later episodes were filmed at Shepperton Studios and Associated-British Elstree Studios, (Associated British Picture Corporation), in England.

Cast
Michael Rennie as Harry Lime
Jonathan Harris as Bradford Webster

Episodes

Season 1 (1959–60)

Season 2 (1962–63)

Season 3 (1964)

Season 4 (1965)

Archive Status

Out of a total of 77 episodes, 8 episodes are currently missing. Unusually, only one episode produced in 1959 is missing. The other 7 are all between 1960 and 1965:

 Series 1 Episode 5  30.10.1959 "The Indispensable Man"
 Series 1 Episode 22 11.03.1960 "A Deal in Oils"
 Series 1 Episode 23 25.03.1960 "A Man Takes a Trip"
 Series 1 Episode 25 08.04.1960 "The Man Who Wouldn't Talk"
 Series 2 Episode 7  06.04.1963 "No Word for Danger"
 Series 2 Episode 8  13.04.1963 "Lord Bradford"
 Series 4 Episode 5  13.08.1965 "The Man at the Top"
 Series 4 Episode 6  20.08.1965 "Proxy Fight"

References

External links
 
 The Third Man at CTVA
 
 The Third Man at Episodate.com

1959 British television series debuts
1965 British television series endings
1950s British drama television series
1960s British drama television series
BBC television dramas
Black-and-white British television shows
English-language television shows
Live action television shows based on films
Television series by CBS Studios
British television spin-offs